GRB 160625B was a bright gamma-ray burst (GRB) detected by NASA's Fermi Gamma-ray Space Telescope on 25 June 2016 and, three minutes later, by the Large Area Telescope. This was followed by a bright prompt optical flash, during which variable linear polarization was measured. This was the first time that these observations were made when the GRB was still bright and active. The source of the GRB was a possible black hole, within the Delphinus constellation, about 9 billion light-years (light travel distance) away (a redshift of z = 1.406).

See also 
 List of gamma ray bursts
 Swift Gamma-Ray Burst Mission
 Ultra-Fast Flash Observatory Pathfinder

References

External links 
 GRB 160625B – NASA/IPAC Extragalactic Database (NED)
 GRB 160625B – Max Planck Institute for Extraterrestrial Physics (MPE)

160625B
20160625
June 2016 events